Nancy Telfer (born Lindsey) (born 8 May 1950) is a Canadian choral conductor, music educator and composer.

Biography
Nancy Ellen Telfer was born in Brampton, Ontario. She began piano lessons at age six and later played French horn in bands, orchestras and chamber ensembles. She graduated from the University of Western Ontario and worked as a music and drama teacher in the public schools. In 1977 she continued her studies at the University of Western Ontario under Jack Behrens, Kenneth Bray, Alan Heard, Deral Johnson, Peter Paul Koprowski, and Gerhard Wuensch. She graduated from the University of Western Ontario with a bachelor's in music in 1979 and began composing.

Works
Telfer has composed more than three hundred works for orchestra and solo instruments, with concentration in choral ensembles and solo voice. She is well known for her work for The Royal Conservatory of Music, contributing many songs to their graded piano repertoire. Selected works include:

Dinosaurus
The Sleeping Dragon
The Sea's Strong Voice
Canadian Kaleidoscope
When rivers flowed on Mars
Moved by the Spirit
Spell of Long Past
Psalm 57
The Ballad of Princess Caraboo
Triune
The Annunciation
Tai Chi Zoo
The Blue Eye of God
Fanfare
Requiem Aeternam
Matters of the Heart
Missa Brevis (1993)
De Profundis (2001)
"The Silent Moon"
"The dream"(Le Reve)
 lullaby

Texts
Telfer is the author of numerous articles on music and texts including:
Sightsinging: A Creative Step-by-Step Approach (San Diego, Cal 1991)
Successful Sight-Singing, Book 2 1993, Kjos
Successful Warmups, Book 1 1995, Kjos
Successful Warmups, Book 2 1996, Kjos
Singing in Tune 2000, Kjos
Singing High Pitches with Ease 2003, Kjos

References

1950 births
20th-century classical composers
Canadian classical composers
Canadian music educators
Living people
University of Western Ontario alumni
Women classical composers
20th-century Canadian composers
Women music educators
20th-century women composers
Canadian women composers